Marcel Meijer (born 26 August 1966) is a Dutch-Danish politician. He is a member of the Social Democrats, and has been the mayor of Samsø Municipality since 2014. He moved to Denmark in 1992. After the 2013 Danish local elections he became the first Social Democratic mayor of Samsø Municipality, as well as the only mayor to not be a Danish citizen. He became a Danish citizen on February 25, 2020.

References 

1966 births
Living people
Danish municipal councillors
Mayors of places in Denmark
Social Democrats (Denmark) politicians
People from Pekela